The FIA Super Licence is a driver's qualification allowing the holder to compete in the Formula One World Championship.

Requirements

Super Licence
To qualify for an FIA Racing Super Licence an applicant must meet the requirements of the FIA's International Sporting Code, Appendix L, Article 5. As of 2021, the article states:
A minimum age of 18 at the start of their first F1 competition.
An existing holder of an International Grade A competition licence.
A holder of a valid driving licence.
Passing of an FIA theory test on knowledge of the F1 sporting codes and regulations when applying for the first time.
Completed at least 80% of each of two full seasons of any of the single-seater Championships reported in Supplement 1 of the regulations.
Accumulated at least 40 points over the previous three seasons in any combination of the championships reported in Supplement 1 of the regulations.

Provided a driver has previously held a super licence, they do not have to meet these requirements:

 A driver who has held a valid super licence for any of the previous three seasons is eligible for a new licence.
 A driver who has previously held a super licence but has not held a valid licence within the previous three years issue is subject to completion of 300 km at race speeds in a representative F1 car over no more than two days, either as part of a test certified by a national racing authority or as part of an official F1 session. This must be completed no more than 180 days before their application.

In 2020, in response to the COVID-19 pandemic, requirement 6 was amended where if the three-season window includes the year 2020, then the highest scoring three seasons out of the four previous seasons are to be counted. If a driver has accumulated at least 30 points and is currently competing in any of the Championships reported in Supplement 1 and has been unable to accumulate the 40 points due to "circumstances outside their control or reasons of force majeure", the licence may be granted at the discretion of the FIA.

As of December 7, 2022, the Supplement 1 Super Licence points, which also qualify for the 80% rule, are awarded according to the following table:

In 2019, for a series to award Super Licence points, a championship season must consist of at least five events spanning at least three different circuits, with alternative circuit configurations considered to be separate circuits. Additionally, a series must have at least 12 drivers compete at any event and a minimum of 16 drivers compete across a season to meet the criteria for full points – a series with 12 or more drivers per event and between 12 and 15 over the course of a season will award 75% points, and a series with entry lists of 11 competitors or lower will not be eligible for points. Championships, such as the 2019 F3 Asian Winter Series, may be set aside points but cannot award them if the championship season does not meet this criteria.

A driver can earn points from either 1 or 2 series in a calendar year. The results from a maximum of 2 championships
can be accumulated from a single calendar year, provided that the start date of the second championship falls after the end date of the first championship during the year in question.

For any season ending in 2020 or 2021 the criteria have decreased from racing five events to three, from three tracks to two and from 16 drivers on the first race to 10.

Drivers may also earn points for:

 1 point – Driving at least 100 km during a Free Practice session for up to 10 points (with one point awarded per World Championship event)
 2 points – Completing an FIA Championship with a penalty points system without receiving any penalty points.
 5 points – Winning the Macau Grand Prix

If multiple drivers complete a season competing in the same car they will be awarded a fraction of their points according to their FIA Driver Categorisation:

 Platinum and Gold ranked drivers – 100% of the points received.
 Silver ranked drivers – 75% of the points received.
 Bronze ranked drivers – 50% of the points received.
 Drivers without a categorisation will be awarded no points.

Free Practice Only Super Licence
Beginning in the 2019 Formula One season the FIA introduced a requirement for drivers participating in free practice sessions to hold a stand-alone Free Practice Only Super Licence with the holding of a standard Super licence not automatically granting a Free Practice Only Super licence. 
The criteria are as follows:
A minimum age of 18 at the start of their first F1 competition.
An existing holder of an International Grade A competition licence.
A holder of a valid driving licence when applying for the first time.
Passing of an FIA theory test on knowledge of the F1 sporting codes and regulations when applying for the first time.
When applying for the first time – Completion of either six races in Formula 2, or accumulated 25 Super Licence points in eligible championships during the previous three years.
All subsequent applications – Completion of either a full season in Formula 2, or accumulated 25 Super Licence points in eligible championships during the previous three years.
Should the three-calendar year period include the year 2020, the FIA will consider the three seasons with most accumulated points in the season out of four seasons.

Renewal, sanctions, and costs

Probation periods and renewal
The FIA issue licences subject to a 12-month probation period after first issue which applies to full and free practice licence. At any time during the first 12 months the FIA may review and withdraw a super licence if the standards to continue holding a licence are not being met.

Super Licences are issued on an annual calendar year basis and must be renewed at the end of each year.

Sanctions
The FIA have a series of sanctions which can be placed on a driver's Super Licence which are in the form of reprimands and penalty points. If a driver accumulated three reprimands over the course of a season the FIA may impose penalty points. If a driver accumulates 12 or more penalty points in a 12-month period they will receive a one race ban for the next event they are scheduled to participate in. The issuing of penalty points is not subject to reprimands being issued as a pre-requisite.

Costs
The FIA charges the licence holder an annual fee. According to a report on the BBC, the cost of a super licence rose by an average £8,700 in 2009, and there was an extra charge of €2,100 per point earned in 2008—up from €447 per point in 2007. In 2009, Lewis Hamilton would pay £242,000 for his licence for the season.

Reducing the cost of the super licence represented a significant policy shift for FIA's then-president Max Mosley, who wrote to Formula 1 drivers in February 2009 suggesting that they "race elsewhere if they were unable to pay for their super licences." After Mosley met with representatives from the Grand Prix Drivers' Association (GPDA) on March 23, 2009, the FIA issued a statement: "Following a very positive meeting between FIA President Max Mosley and representatives of the Grand Prix Drivers' Association (GPDA), a proposal will be made to the World Motor Sport Council to revise super licence fees for drivers in the 2010 championship".

In November 2012, however, FIA announced it would again increase the cost of the super licence. According to McLaren team principal Martin Whitmarsh, the proposed increase would lead to a basic fee of €10,000 ($12,800) for the super licence plus €1,000 ($1,280) for each World Championship point. 2009 Formula 1 World Driver's Champion Jenson Button objected, and expressed his position that all current F1 drivers should pay the same flat fee for their super licences:

Button's total super licensing costs for the 2010 season, based on his 2009 results, were variously reported as over a quarter of a million Euros by one source and approximately €1M ($1.28M) by others.

Nationality of drivers

The nationality that appears on the racing licence is identical to a driver's passport. This is not necessarily the same as the country issuing the racing licence. A Frenchman living in Germany would receive a licence issued by the German motorsport authorities, but the nationality displayed on the licence would still be French. In order to race with a licence that displays German, the driver would need to have a German passport as well. Drivers with multiple citizenship choose their "official" nationality.

As a result of this rule, several mistakes occurred on official entry lists issued by and podium ceremonies organized by the FIA or race organisers, the most notable relating to Eddie Irvine. He was a British citizen throughout his career and he held a racing licence issued by the National Sporting Authority of the Republic of Ireland. The FIA mistakenly issued official entry lists (for the 1995 and 1996 seasons) which stated that Irvine was competing as an Irish national. This situation also created some confusion as to Irvine's nationality when he appeared at podium ceremonies in the Formula One World Championship. During his earliest podium appearances (at the 1995 Canadian Grand Prix, 1996 Australian Grand Prix, 1997 Argentine Grand Prix and 1997 Monaco Grand Prix), an Irish Tricolour was mistakenly flown by the race organisers.

This rule, however, has not been in force since the beginning of the Formula One World Championship. In the past, the choice of the nationality was up to the driver. Jochen Rindt, for instance, chose to hold in Formula One an Austrian nationality. He  competed with a license issued by the Austrian National Sporting Authority during his career, despite the fact he was born in Germany and had German and not Austrian citizenship.

Notes

References

External links
Official FIA website
Appendix L - International Drivers' licenses, medical examinations, driver's equipment and conduct - 2020

Fédération Internationale de l'Automobile
Formula One
Driving licences